Harry's Girls is an American sitcom which aired on NBC from September 13, 1963 to January 3, 1964. The series stars Larry Blyden portraying Henry Burns, the leader of a vaudeville troupe consisting of three young women. The co-stars were Dawn Nickerson as Lois, Susan Silo as Rusty, and Diahn Williams as Terry.

Synopsis
Harry serves as the lovestruck chaperone of the girls as well as the manager of their entertainment program. None of the episodes had big-name guest stars, and the program failed to complete a single season.

Cast
Larry Blyden.....Henry Burns
Susan Silo.....Rusty
Diahn Williams.....Terry
Dawn Nickerson.....Lois

Episode list

References

External links
 

1963 American television series debuts
1964 American television series endings
1960s American sitcoms
NBC original programming
Black-and-white American television shows
English-language television shows
Television series by MGM Television